The 2018 African Nations Championship was an international football tournament  held in Morocco from 13 January to 4 February 2018. Unlike the Africa Cup of Nations, this tournament requires players to be registered to a club within the country to be eligible. The 16 national teams involved in the tournament were required to register a squad of 23 players, including three goalkeepers. Only players in these squads were eligible to take part in the tournament. The squads were announced on 10 January 2018.

Group A

Morocco
Manager: Jamal Sellami

Guinea
Manager: Lappé Bangoura

Sudan
Manager:  Zdravko Logarušić

Mauritania
Manager:  Corentin Martins

Group B

Ivory Coast
Manager: Ibrahim Kamara

Zambia
Manager: Wedson Nyirenda

Uganda
Manager:  Sébastien Desabre

Namibia
Manager: Ricardo Mannetti

Group C

Libya
Coach: Omar Al-Maryami

Nigeria
Manager: Salisu Yusuf

Rwanda
Manager:  Antoine Hey

Equatorial Guinea
Coach: Rodolfo Bodipo

Group D

Angola
Manager:  Srđan Vasiljević

Cameroon
Manager: Rigobert Song

Congo
Manager: Barthélémy Ngatsono

Burkina Faso
Manager: Idrissa Malo Traoré

References

Squads
African Nations Championship squads